
Gmina Raciąż is a rural gmina (administrative district) in Płońsk County, Masovian Voivodeship, in east-central Poland. Its seat is the town of Raciąż, although the town is not part of the territory of the gmina.

Villages
Gmina Raciąż contains the villages and settlements of Bielany, Bogucin, Budy Kraszewskie, Charzyny, Chyczewo, Cieciersk, Ćwiersk, Dobrska-Kolonia, Dobrska-Włościany, Draminek, Drozdowo, Druchowo, Folwark-Raciąż, Grzybowo, Jeżewo-Wesel, Kaczorowy, Kiełbowo, Kiniki, Kocięcin-Brodowy, Kocięcin-Tworki, Kodłutowo, Kossobudy, Koziebrody, Kozolin, Krajkowo, Krajkowo-Budki, Kraśniewo, Kraszewo-Czubaki, Kraszewo-Falki, Kraszewo-Gaczułty, Kraszewo Podborne, Kraszewo-Rory, Kraszewo-Sławęcin, Kruszenica, Łempinek, Łempino, Lipa, Mała Wieś, Malewo, Młody Niedróż, Nowe Gralewo, Nowe Młodochowo, Nowy Komunin, Pęsy, Pólka-Raciąż, Sierakowo, Sikory, Stare Gralewo, Stare Młodochowo, Stary Komunin, Stary Niedróż, Strożęcin, Szapsk, Szczepkowo, Unieck, Wępiły, Witkowo, Zdunówek, Złotopole, Żukowo-Strusie, Żukowo-Wawrzonki and Żychowo.

Neighbouring gminas
Gmina Raciąż is bordered by the town of Raciąż and by the gminas of Baboszewo, Drobin, Glinojeck, Radzanów, Siemiątkowo, Staroźreby, Strzegowo and Zawidz.

References

Polish official population figures 2006

Raciaz
Płońsk County